Never Surrender is a 2009 MMA film about an MMA champion who finds himself fighting in illegal underground cage fights. The film's cast features a number of real MMA fighters. It was filmed in Los Angeles, California and was produced by Destiny Entertainment Productions. It is distributed in the United States by Lions Gate Entertainment.

Cast
 Hector Echavarria as Diego Carter
 Patrick Kilpatrick as Seifer
 Silvia Koys as Sandra
 James Russo as Jimmy
 Georges St-Pierre as Georges
 Anderson Silva as Spider
 Heath Herring as Stone
 Quinton Jackson as Rampage
 B.J. Penn as BJ
 Damian Perkins as Diamond
 Lateef Crowder as Marco
 Gunter Schlierkamp as Crusher

See also
 Confessions of a Pit Fighter, a 2005 film with a similar theme

References

External links
 

2009 films
American martial arts films
Mixed martial arts films
Underground fighting films
2000s English-language films
2000s American films